Robert A. Fletcher is an illustrator and artist. While he is best known for his military artwork, his scenes of Warwick, New York and lower Hudson Valley of New York have been widely praised.

Career
After serving in the Korean War, Fletcher became a general partner in the advertising agency Fletcher-Walker-Gessell. For twenty five years he worked with a variety of clients. His illustrations appeared in magazines and his technical drawings have been featured in Aviation Week, Flight Magazine, and Jane’s Armament Books.

Exhibitions
In commemoration of National Veteran’s Week 2000 Fletcher was invited to exhibit twenty one military paintings at the Cannon Office Building rotunda, Washington D.C. The event was sponsored by Congressman Ben Gilman.

To commemorate National Veteran’s Week 2002 Fletcher was again invited to exhibit twenty one military paintings at the Russell Senate Office Building rotunda, Washington D.C. The event was sponsored by Senator John Warner of Virginia. This occasion also marked the introduction of the book Remembrance: A Tribute to America’s Veterans, a collaboration between and his son, the writer Robert B. Fletcher. It delves into the history of America’s wars from the American Revolutionary War to Afghanistan.

Work

Much of Fletcher's work features historic Warwick, New York, the Warwick Valley, the Hudson Valley, and areas of New England such as Newport, Rhode Island.

Honors
In 1999 he was honored as American Legion Citizen of the year in Orange County, New York. He was recently nominated Outstanding Senior of New York State.

In 2005 he illustrated a children’s book, I Grew Up On A Farm, by Alan Lewis. He served as guest illustrator of 2006 for the White House Commission on Remembrance.

Living people
Year of birth missing (living people)
People from Warwick, New York